Within the city-operated parks system of New York City, there are many parks that are either named after individuals who participated in the Vietnam War or contain monuments relating to the war.

Manhattan

 Vietnam Veterans Plaza
 Anibal Aviles Playground
 Corporal John A. Seravalli Playground

Bronx

 Carlos J. Lozada Playground

Queens

 Strack Pond
 Elmhurst Park has the Queens Vietnam Veterans Memorial
 Private William Gray Park
 Walter J. Wetzel Triangle
 Strippoli Square
 Nine Heroes Plaza
 Ten Heroes Plaza
 Frank J. McManus Memorial
 L/CPL Thomas P. Noonan Jr. Playground

Brooklyn

 Barone Triangle
 Colonel Donald Cook Square
 Hickman Playground
 John Allen Payne Park
 Pfc Norton Playground
 Russell Pedersen Playground
 Father Kehoe Square has a memorial for this war.
 John Paul Jones Park has a memorial for this war.

Staten Island

 Buono Beach
 Capodanno Memorial
 Lt. Lia Playground

References

Squares in New York City
Monuments and memorials in New York City
Military history of New York City
Vietnam War monuments and memorials in the United States
New York City parks-related lists